Maquan Pond is a  pond in Hanson, Massachusetts. The pond is spring fed with an overflow on the south end that feeds into Indian Head Pond. There has been much development along the shore. The town has a right-of-way on the northern shore of the pond off Maquan Street (Route 14). The town beach Cranberry Cove is at south end of the pond. The water is acidic, so fishing is poor except for pickerel, small yellow perch and pumpkinseeds.

Camp Kiwanee, a former Camp Fire camp, is located on the southeastern shore of the pond.  The town now owns the camp and rents camping and cabins as well as Needles Lodge for functions.  The Rainbow Girls own land on the southwest shore and previously operated a summer camp there.

External links
MassWildlife - Pond map and info
South Shore Coastal Watersheds - Lake Assessments

Ponds of Plymouth County, Massachusetts
Ponds of Massachusetts